Eric Victor Shanes (21 October 1944 – 19 March 2017) was an English painter and art historian who specialised in the art of J. M. W. Turner.

Selected publications
 Young Mr. Turner The First Forty Years, 1775–1815. Yale, New Haven, 2016.

See also
John Gage

References 

1944 births
2017 deaths
People from Bedford
English painters
English art historians
J. M. W. Turner